Liam James McAlinden (born 26 September 1993) is a professional footballer who plays as a forward for  club Wrexham. Born in England, he is a former youth international for Ireland.

Playing career

Wolves
McAlinden signed his first professional contract in 2010 with Wolves, before making his senior debut on 27 April 2013 as a substitute in a 1–2 defeat to Burnley.

The striker has represented Northern Ireland at youth levels as, although born in England, he qualified through his grandfather. However, in June 2013, he switched his allegiance to the Republic of Ireland, from which his parents hail.

He scored his first senior goal on 3 September 2013 in a Football League Trophy tie against Walsall. Later in the season, he scored his first Wolves league goal to earn a 1–0 victory at MK Dons in March 2014 as the team went on to win promotion back to the Championship.

In October 2013 McAlinden was loaned to fellow League One club Shrewsbury Town for three months. He scored on his club debut after coming on as a substitute against Gillingham, the first of three goals in nine appearances before being recalled by Wolves in early December.

In October 2014 McAlinden moved on a three-month-loan deal to League One Fleetwood Town. However, after scoring twice in his first 5 appearances for Fleetwood, he was recalled to cover injuries at his parent club. On 15 January 2015 McAlinden returned on loan to Fleetwood for the remainder of the season, where he scored two further goals during 14 appearances.

McAlinden returned to Shrewsbury Town for a second time on a half-season loan in July 2015. In March 2016 he signed a loan deal with Crawley Town until the end of the 2015–16 season.

McAlinden was released by Wolverhampton at the end of the 2015–16 season after his contract was not renewed.

Exeter City
On 31 May 2016, McAlinden signed for League Two club Exeter City. He scored his first goal for Exeter in a 2–1 defeat to Hartlepool United on 13 August 2016.

He was released by Exeter at the end of the 2017–18 season.

Cheltenham Town
Follow his release from Exeter, McAlinden signed a two-year deal with League Two side Cheltenham Town on 28 July 2018. On 15 December 2018, McAllinden joined Brackley Town on an initial month's loan. He then returned to Cheltenham after one month, and two days later, he then joined Kidderminster Harriers also on loan deal for one month. The club announced on 21 February 2019, that the loan deal had been extended until the end of the season.

FC Halifax Town
At the start of the 2019–20 season he signed for FC Halifax Town.

Stockport County
On 14 January 2020, he signed for Stockport County.

Morecambe 
On 4 August 2020, McAlinden signed for League Two club Morecambe. He was released at the end of the 2020–21 season after a disappointing spell at the club.

Wrexham 
On 9 July 2021, McAlinden signed for National League side Wrexham on a two-year deal.

Career statistics

Honours

Wolverhampton Wanderers
League One: 2013–14

Morecambe
EFL League Two play-offs: 2021

Wrexham
FA Trophy runner-up: 2021–22

References

External links

1993 births
Living people
People from Cannock
Republic of Ireland association footballers
Republic of Ireland under-21 international footballers
Association footballers from Northern Ireland
Northern Ireland under-21 international footballers
English footballers
English people of Irish descent
English people of Northern Ireland descent
Association football forwards
Wolverhampton Wanderers F.C. players
Shrewsbury Town F.C. players
Fleetwood Town F.C. players
Crawley Town F.C. players
Cheltenham Town F.C. players
Brackley Town F.C. players
Kidderminster Harriers F.C. players
FC Halifax Town players
Stockport County F.C. players
Morecambe F.C. players
Wrexham A.F.C. players
English Football League players
National League (English football) players